These hits topped the Ultratop 50 in the Flanders region of Belgium in 1984.

Singles

1984 Year-End Chart

Singles

See also
1984 in music

References

1984 in Belgium
1984 record charts
1984